This is a list of Nigerian diplomats. A diplomat is a person appointed by a state to conduct diplomacy with one or more other states or international organisations. The main functions of diplomats are: representation and protection of the interests and nationals of the sending state; initiation and facilitation of strategic agreements; treaties and conventions; promotion of information; trade and commerce; technology; and friendly relations.

Nigerian diplomats

 Ayorinde Ajakaiye
 Catherine Obianuju Acholonu
 Adebayo Adedeji
 Adebowale Adefuye
 Ayo Aderinwale
 Hamzat Ahmadu
 Aduke Alakija
 Alhaji Abubakar Alhaji
 PM Brai
 Mohammed Mabdul
 Emeka Anyaoku
 Phillip Asiodu
 Chukwuma Azikiwe
 Oluseyi Bajulaiye
 Philip O. Emafo
 Okechukwu Nwadiuto Emuchay
 L. A. Fabunmi
 Antonio Deinde Fernandez
 Ibrahim Gambari
 Christopher Kolade
 Sebastian Okechukwu Mezu
 Kingsley Moghalu
 Tijjani Muhammad-Bande
 Bianca Odumegwu-Ojukwu
 Olusegun Olusola
 Michael Omolewa
 Adoga Onah
 Peter Onu
 Ebun Oyagbola
 Olu Oyesanya
 Mohammed Lawal Rafindadi
 Christopher Oluwole Rotimi
 Timothy Shelpidi
 Julius Momo Udochi
 Onyedika Chiegboka Ezenekwe
 Okon Uya
 Margaret Vogt
 Jaja Wachuku
 Bashir Yuguda
 Iyorwuese Hagher
 Wahab Adekola Akande

Ambassadors of Nigeria

Foreign ministers of Nigeria

 
 Henry Adefope 
 Oluyemi Adeniji 
 Bolaji Akinyemi 
 Emeka Anyaoku 
 Olugbenga Ashiru 
 Ishaya Audu 
 Abubakar Tafawa Balewa 
 Nuhu Bamalli 
 Joseph Nanven Garba 
 Tom Ikimi 
 Baba Gana Kingibe 
 Sule Lamido 
 Ojo Maduekwe 
 Matthew Mbu 
 Ike Nwachukwu 
 Joy Ogwu 
 Arikpo Okoi 
 Ngozi Okonjo-Iweala 
 Ignatius Olisemeka 
 Viola Onwuliri 
 Geoffrey Onyeama 
 Jaja Wachuku 
 Aminu Bashir Wali

References

 
Diplomats